The name HMS Churchill has been borne by two Royal Navy ships: a destroyer and a submarine. 

  was a  during World War II. It was named for towns of that name common to Britain and the United States.
  was the first of three  nuclear-powered fleet submarines. Named for Winston Churchill (Prime Minister of the United Kingdom during World War II), she was launched in 1968 and decommissioned in 1991.

See also
 HMCS Churchill, a Royal Canadian Navy shore establishment from 1950 to 1966.
 , a destroyer in the United States Navy.

Royal Navy ship names